The Swansgate Shopping Centre is a shopping centre in the town centre of Wellingborough, Northamptonshire, England. It is the second largest shopping centre in Northamptonshire after the Grosvenor Centre in Northampton.  It was built in the early 1970s and was originally known as the Arndale Centre.

Stores
There are over 50 stores including Boots, W H Smith, Superdrug, and Poundland.

References

Shopping centres in Northamptonshire
Buildings and structures in Northamptonshire